René Tas, is a vice admiral of the Dutch Navy, he is the Commander of the Royal Netherlands Navy after replacing vice admiral Rob A. Kramer from 9 September 2021. He is also the Admiral Benelux (ABNL) which is the Commanding Officer of the combined military staff of the Royal Netherlands Navy and the Naval Component of the Belgian Armed Forces.

References 

Commanders of the Royal Netherlands Navy
People from Sluis
1964 births
Living people